Gábor Obitz also known as Gábor Óbecsei and Gábor Ormai (18 January 1899 – 20 March 1953) was a Hungarian football player and manager.

Playing career 

Obitz started his career in Ferencvárosi TC. After winning the Hungarian Cup title in 1922 he moved to Czechoslovakia and played three seasons for Makkabi Brno. In 1925 he joined German club Holstein Kiel. He ended his career in Ferencvárosi.

Obitz capped 15 times for the Hungary national team and participated the 1924 Summer Olympics in Paris.

Coaching career 
Obitz' first team as a manager was a Romanian club AMEF Arad. From 1932 to 1934 he worked for the Turkish Football Federation. He coached NK Ljubljana in the 1936–37 Yugoslav Football Championship. In 1939 Obitz started coaching the Finnish national team but soon returned to Hungary due to World War II.

Honours 
Hungarian Championship: 1927, 1928
Hungarian Cup: 1921, 1927, 1928
Mitropa Cup: 1928

References 

1899 births
1953 deaths
Hungarian footballers
Footballers from Budapest
Association football defenders
Hungary international footballers
Olympic footballers of Hungary
Footballers at the 1924 Summer Olympics
Ferencvárosi TC footballers
Holstein Kiel players
Hungarian football managers
Finland national football team managers
Hungarian expatriate football managers
Hungarian expatriate sportspeople in Czechoslovakia
Expatriate footballers in Czechoslovakia
Hungarian expatriate sportspeople in Germany
Expatriate footballers in Germany
Hungarian expatriate sportspeople in Finland
Expatriate football managers in Finland
Hungarian expatriate sportspeople in Yugoslavia
Expatriate football managers in Yugoslavia